Wild Honey is a 1918 silent film western directed by Francis J. Grandon and starring Doris Kenyon.

This picture is preserved in the archives of the Museum of Modern Art.

Cast
 Doris Kenyon – Wild Honey/ Mrs. Holbrook
 Frank R. Mills – Reverend Jim Brown/Pastor Holbrook (*this Frank Mills, stage actor born 1870 died 1921)
 Edgar Jones – Dick Jones
 John Hopkins – Joe Stacey
 Joseph P. Mack – Jim Belcher
 Howard Kyle – Doc Bliss
 H. J. Hebert – Ed Southern
 Herbert Standing – Reverend David Warwick
 Nellie King – Minnie Lou
 Vinnie Burns – Trixianita
 Ruth Taylor – Gold Hill Ida
 Mildred Leary – Letty Noon

References

External links
 
 
 Wild Honey at Silentera.com

1918 films
1918 Western (genre) films
Films directed by Francis J. Grandon
Films based on short fiction
American black-and-white films
Silent American Western (genre) films
1910s American films
1910s English-language films